Indrek Tobreluts (born 5 April 1976) is an Estonian former biathlete and cross-country skier. He has competed at five Winter Olympics.

Life and career
At the 2006 Winter Olympics in Turin, he finished 15th in the men's relay, 40th in the men's sprint, 43rd in the men's pursuit and 66th in the men's individual. At the 2010 Winter Olympics in Vancouver, he finished 14th in the 4 × 7.5 km relay, 31st in the 10 km sprint and 48th in the 12.5 km pursuit.

After an injury ahead of the 2015–16 season, Tobreluts announced his retirement on 14 January 2016.

Biathlon results
All results are sourced from the International Biathlon Union.

Olympic Games

*Pursuit was added as an event in 2002, with mass start being added in 2006 and the mixed relay in 2014.

World Championships

*During Olympic seasons competitions are only held for those events not included in the Olympic program.
**Team was removed as an event in 1998, and pursuit was added in 1997 with mass start being added in 1999 and the mixed relay in 2005.

References

External links
 

1976 births
Living people
Sportspeople from Tartu
Estonian male biathletes
Estonian male cross-country skiers
Biathletes at the 1998 Winter Olympics
Biathletes at the 2002 Winter Olympics
Biathletes at the 2006 Winter Olympics
Biathletes at the 2010 Winter Olympics
Biathletes at the 2014 Winter Olympics
Cross-country skiers at the 2002 Winter Olympics
Olympic biathletes of Estonia
Olympic cross-country skiers of Estonia